Menegazzia hollermayeri is a species of foliose lichen found in southern South America. It was first formally described as a new species in 1937 by Finnish lichenologist Veli Räsänen, who included it in genus Parmelia. The type specimen was collected from Chile by R. P. Atanasio Hollermayer, after whom the lichen is named. Rolf Santesson transferred the taxon to Menegazzia in 1942.

See also
 List of Menegazzia species

References

hollermayeri
Lichen species
Lichens described in 1937
Lichens of southern South America
Taxa named by Veli Räsänen